Portschinskia is a genus of flies. They are also known as bumblebee bot flies due to their striking resemblance to bumblebees both in habit and colour patterns. Like all bot flies they are obligate parasites whose larvae develop in mammals.

Taxonomy 
The first phylogenetic study of Portschinskia of all 11 species, including four new species, was published in 2020.

 Portschinskia bombiformis Portschinsky, 1901
 Portschinskia burmensis Xin-Yu Li, Thomas Pape, Dong Zhang, 2020
 Portschinskia gigas Portschinsky, 1901
 Portschinskia himalayana Grunin, 1962
 Portschinskia loewii Schnabl, 1877
 Portschinskia magnifica Pleske, 1926
 Portschinskia neugebaueri Portschinsky, 1881
 Portschinskia przewalskyi Portschinsky, 1887
 Portschinskia sichuanensis Xin-Yu Li, Thomas Pape, Dong Zhang, 2020
 Portschinskia xizangensis Xin-Yu Li, Thomas Pape, Dong Zhang, 2020
 Portschinskia yunnanensis Xin-Yu Li, Thomas Pape, Dong Zhang, 2020

See also 
 Botfly

References

External links 

Oestridae
Parasitic flies
Parasites of equines
Parasitic arthropods of mammals
Veterinary entomology
Insects in culture
Flies and humans